Wang Xun (born 27 November 1974) is a Chinese actor, screenwriter and director.

Early life
He was born in Wuhou district in Sichuan and is the Secretary General of Political and Legal Circles of Sichuan Youth Federation, member of the Chengdu Youth Federation, Sichuan Artists Association, and the Vice Chairman of the Chengdu Artists Association. Before establishing his career in the entertainment industry, he was a soldier.

Career

1992–2004: Humble beginnings
He was apprentice to multiple established figures in the entertainment world including Chen Fa (沈伐) and Yang Ziyang (杨紫阳) where he learned acting and starred in small screens in various television stations.

2006–2011: Career advancement
In 2006, he starred in his first big screen movie, Crazy Stone directed by Ning Hao. He garnered more exposure after this role. He starred in Big Movie alongside Huang Bo and Yao Chen later that year.

In 2007 and 2008, he focused on his career as a screenwriter at CCTV and created the screenwriting for CCTV Spring Gala, and many other small screen shows.

He was inducted for a role in Ning Hao's film in 2009, Crazy Racer where his acting received praise from the director. Later in 2009, he starred in his first drama, My Chief and My Regiment and Non-Local Person. He was cast in Mountain Army  and was the supporting role in One Night in Supermarket.

In 2011, he was injured during an explosion scene in the drama which he starred in, Fight Till the End.

2012–present: HB Studio and continuous popularity
He signed under Huang Bo Studios (黄渤工作室) in 2012. In 2012, he took a supporting role in A Unique Militiaman and Design of Death where he contributed his services to the cast as a Sichuan dialect teacher in the latter. Huang Bo invited Wang Xun to star in the film the former directed himself, Special Service. Apart from acting, Wang Xun contributed in the screenwriting and producing of the film which made him gain the epithet of a "technical talent". The film would later garner the "Best Online Film of the Year" award at the Shanghai International Film Festival.

In 2013, he starred in The Chef, The Actor, The Scoundrel alongside Huang Bo, Liu Ye and Zhang Hanyu. The trio would later collaborate again in the drama Fire Line, Three Brothers. Wang Xun co-starred with Lin Chi-ling and Huang Bo in 101st Marriage Proposal. In late 2013, the drama, 10 Farewells to the Red Army which he starred in was broadcast on CCTV1.

In 2014, he was starred as the supporting cast of the film, The Red and drama, Sharp Blade. He made an appearance in the third season of Wonder Lady.

In 2015, he was the cast for the drama, WangDaHua. Xu Zheng would later recruit him to star in the film the former directed himself, Lost in Hong Kong. The film was a commercial success in China. His popularity surged further with his partaking in the popular variety game show, Go Fighting! alongside Zhang Yixing, Show Lo, Huang Bo, Huang Lei and Sun Honglei.

In 2016, he starred in Dongbei History, So Lucky and Royal Treasure with Go Fighting! cast members. He was announced in December to be starring in Some Like It Hot. In 2017, he starred in What A Wonderful Family alongside cast member Huang Lei.

Awards
Wang Xun won Best Asian Actor the New Vision International Film Festival Awards in 2019.

Filmography

Films

Television series

Variety shows

References

Chinese male film actors
Chinese male television actors
Screenwriters from Sichuan
1974 births
Living people
21st-century Chinese male actors
Actors from Chengdu
Writers from Chengdu
Film directors from Sichuan